Oliver David Townend  (born 15 November 1982) is a British eventing rider competing at the international three-day level. His wins include team gold at the 2007, 2009 and 2017 European Championships and wins at Badminton Horse Trials, Burghley Horse Trials, and the Kentucky Three Day Event. He also represented Britain at the World Equestrian Games in 2006 and 2014. He was the Event Rider Masters series champion in 2016. He has been eventing's world number one twice, in 2009 and again in 2018, and British number one seven times since 2009.

Biography

Townend was raised in Scapegoat Hill, a small settlement on the moors near Huddersfield in West Yorkshire. He won the junior newcomers showjumping at the Horse of the Year Show with Cool Mule aged 11, rode in the pony European Eventing Championships aged 13 and left school at 16 to pursue riding and selling horses professionally. He credits his love of horses to his parents. His father was also an event rider and his mother showed side-saddle.

In 2010, Townend had his horse fall on top of him while participating in the Rolex Kentucky Three Day in Lexington, Kentucky. He broke his collarbone, shoulder bones, sternum and four ribs, but credited the air bag vest with allowing him to leave the hospital after only one day, saying that without the vest he "would be in a box or in America for a month".

Townend presently lives at Ellesmere, Shropshire.

Townend was appointed Member of the Order of the British Empire (MBE) in the 2022 New Year Honours for services to equestrianism.

International Championship Results

CCI 5* Results

Notable Horses

Flint Curtis
2006 Badminton Horse Trials third place
2007 & 2009 European Championships - team gold
2009 Badminton Horse Trials winner
Carousel Quest
2009 Burghley Horse Trials winner
Armarda
2014 Badminton Horse Trials runner up
Willingapark Cooley
2017 European Championships - team gold 
2018 Badminton Horse Trials runner up 
Cillnabraden Evo
 Badminton 5* dressage record holder (19.7)
Ballaghmor Class
2017 Burghley Horse Trials winner
2018 Burghley Horse Trials runner up
2019 Badminton 5* runner up
2019 Burghley 5* runner up
2021 Kentucky 5* winner
2020 Olympic Games - team gold, individual 5th
Cooley Master Class
2018 & 2019 Kentucky 5* winner
2019 European Championships - team silver, individual 9th
2021 Maryland 5* runner up
Swallow Springs
2022 Badminton 5* third place

References

External links

British event riders
1982 births
Living people
Sportspeople from Huddersfield
British male equestrians
Equestrians at the 2020 Summer Olympics
Medalists at the 2020 Summer Olympics
Olympic equestrians of Great Britain
Olympic medalists in equestrian
Olympic gold medallists for Great Britain
Members of the Order of the British Empire